Bernardo Accolti (September 11, 1465March 1, 1536) was an Italian poet.

He was born at Arezzo, the son of Benedetto Accolti.

Known in his own day as l'Unico Aretino, he acquired great fame as a reciter of impromptu verse. He was listened to by large crowds, composed of the most learned men and the most distinguished prelates of the age. Among others, Cardinal Pietro Bembo left on record a testimony to his extraordinary talent. He was so highly regarded and received such lavish remuneration by Pope Leo X that he was able to buy the Duchy of Nepi.

It is probable that he succeeded better in his extemporaneous productions than in those which were the fruit of deliberation. His works, under the title Virginia, Comedia, Capitoli e Strambotti di Messer Bernardo Accolti Aretino, were published at Florence in 1513, and have been reprinted several times.

Notes

References

 Jonathan Unglaub, “Bernardo Accolti, Raphael’s Parnassus and a New Portrait by Andrea Del Sarto,” Burlington Magazine CXLIX (January 2007): 14–22.
 Jonathan Unglaub, “Bernardo Accolti and Raphael’s Sistine Madonna: the Poetics of Desire and Pictorial Generation,” in Ut pictura amor: The Reflexive Imagery of Love in Artistic Theory and Practice, 1400-1700, Walter Melion, Joanna Woodall, and Michael Zell, eds. (Boston and Leiden: Brill, 2017), 612-45.

External links 
 
Verginia : comedia di m. Bernardo Accolti Aretino, intitolata la Verginia : con un capitolo della Madonna (1535)

1465 births
1536 deaths
Italian poets
Italian male poets
People from Arezzo